The Man I Want to Be is the second studio album of American country music artist Chris Young. It was released on September 1, 2009 via RCA Nashville. The album includes the singles "Voices", "Gettin' You Home (The Black Dress Song)", and "The Man I Want to Be", all of which reached Number One single on the Billboard Hot Country Songs chart.

Content 
"Voices" was released in May 2008 as the album's first single. It peaked at number 37 on the Billboard Hot Country Songs chart, becoming Young's first Top 40 country hit. The album, originally to have been released in August 2008, was then delayed until September 2009. The second and third singles, "Gettin' You Home (The Black Dress Song)" and the title track, which were released in January 2009 and November 2009 respectively, both reached Number One on the country charts. In July 2010, Young re-released "Voices", his third consecutive Number One hit on the Hot Country Songs chart.

The album also includes cover versions of Waylon Jennings' 1987 hit "Rose in Paradise" (recorded here as a duet with Willie Nelson) and Tony Joe White's "Rainy Night in Georgia." In addition, "It Takes a Man" was previously a single in 2005 for Aaron Lines from his album Waitin' on the Wonderful.

Track listing

Personnel
Eddie Bayers- drums
Shannon Forrest- drums
Paul Franklin- dobro, steel guitar
Kenny Greenberg- electric guitar
Tania Hancheroff- background vocals
Aubrey Haynie- fiddle, mandolin
Wes Hightower- background vocals
John Hobbs- keyboards, piano
Brent Mason- electric guitar
Steve Nathan- keyboards, piano
Willie Nelson- duet vocals on "Rose in Paradise"
Biff Watson- acoustic guitar
Glenn Worf- bass guitar
Chris Young- lead vocals

Chart performance 

The Man I Want to Be debuted at number 6 on the U.S. Billboard Top Country Albums chart and number 19 on the U.S. Billboard 200. As of the chart dated February 26, 2011, the album has sold 418,528 copies in the US.

Weekly charts

Year-end charts

Singles

Certifications

References 

2009 albums
Chris Young (musician) albums
RCA Records albums
Albums produced by James Stroud